Joanna Mazur (born 14 March 1990) is a blind Polish Paralympic athlete who competes in sprinting events in international level events. She has been blind since she was seven years old due to a rare genetic defect.

Mazur was a contestant on Dancing with the Stars: Taniec z gwiazdami in 2019.

References

1990 births
Living people
Sportspeople from Kraków
Paralympic athletes of Poland
Polish female sprinters
Polish female middle-distance runners
Athletes (track and field) at the 2016 Summer Paralympics